In probability theory and statistics, the noncentral beta distribution is a continuous probability distribution that is a noncentral generalization of the (central) beta distribution.

The noncentral beta distribution (Type I) is the distribution of the ratio

In this case, 

A Type II noncentral beta distribution is the distribution
of the ratio 
 
where the noncentral chi-squared variable is in the denominator only. If  follows 
the type II distribution, then  follows a type I distribution.

Cumulative distribution function 

The Type I cumulative distribution function is usually represented as a Poisson mixture of central beta random variables:

That is,

The Type II cumulative distribution function in mixture form is

Algorithms for evaluating the noncentral beta distribution functions are given by Posten and Chattamvelli.

Probability density function 
The (Type I) probability density function for the noncentral beta distribution is:

The density of Y is the same as that of 1-X with the degrees of freedom reversed.

Related distributions

Transformations 
If , then  follows a noncentral F-distribution with  degrees of freedom, and non-centrality parameter .

If  follows a noncentral F-distribution  with  numerator degrees of freedom and  denominator degrees of freedom, then

follows a noncentral Beta distribution:
.
This is derived from making a straightforward transformation.

Special cases 
When , the noncentral beta distribution is equivalent to the (central) beta distribution.

References

Citations

Sources 

 M. Abramowitz and I. Stegun, editors (1965) "Handbook of Mathematical Functions", Dover: New York, NY.
 
 
 Christian Walck, "Hand-book on Statistical Distributions for experimentalists."

Continuous distributions
b